Natasha Purich (born June 5, 1995) is a Canadian pair skater.

With former partner Raymond Schultz, she placed fifth at the 2011 World Junior Championships and won the 2011 Canadian junior title. After their partnership ended in 2012, Purich teamed up with Sebastian Arcieri for 2012–13 season. She competed with Mervin Tran for the 2013–14 season before switching to Andrew Wolfe for the 2014–15 season.

Purich has also competed in single skating.

Programs

With Chudak

With Tran

With Arcieri

With Schultz

Single skating

Competitive highlights 
GP: Grand Prix; JGP: Junior Grand Prix

Pairs with Chudak

Pairs with Wolfe

Pairs with Tran

Pairs with Arcieri

Pairs with Schultz

Ladies' singles

References

External links 

 
 
 
 
 

1995 births
Living people
Canadian female pair skaters
Canadian female single skaters
Figure skaters from Edmonton
21st-century Canadian women